Hexarthridae is a family of rotifers belonging to the order Flosculariaceae.

Genera:
 Hexarthra Schmarda, 1854

References

Flosculariaceae
Rotifer families